The Yonenga worm snake (Amerotyphlops yonenagae), also known commonly as Yonenaga's worm snake, is a species of snake in the family Typhlopidae. The species is endemic to Brazil.

Etymology
The specific name, yonenagae (Latin, feminine, genitive singular), is in honor of Yatiyo Yonenaga-Yassuda. She is a Brazilian mammalogist of Japanese descent.

Geographic range
A. yonenagae is found in the Brazilian state of Bahia.

Habitat
The preferred natural habitat of A. yonenagae is forest.

Description
It has 18 scale rows around the body, for the full length of the body. Dorsally, it is cream-colored, with a darker middorsal line, which is well-marked and extends from the back of the head to the tail. Ventrally, it is immaculate.

Reproduction
A. yonenagae is oviparous.

References

Further reading
Hedges SB, Marion AB, Lipp KM, Marin J, Vidal N (2014). "A taxonomic framework for typhlopid snakes from the Caribbean and other regions (Reptilia, Squamata)". Caribbean Herpetology 49: 1–61. (Amerotyphlops yonenagae, new combination).
Lambertz M (2010). "Kommentierte Liste der squamaten Reptilien des Sanddünengebeites am mittleren Rio São Francisco (Bahia, Brasilien) unter besonderer Berücksichtigung endemischer Faunenelemente". Ophidia 4 (2): 2–17. (Typhlops yonenagae). (in German).
Rodrigues MT (1991). "Herpetofauna das dunas interiores do rio São Francisco, Bahia, Brasil. 4. Uma nova especie de Typhlops (Ophidia, Typhlopidae)". Papéis Avulsos de Zoologia, Museu de Zoologia da Universidade de São Paulo 37 (22): 343–346. (Typhlops yonenagae, new species). (in Portuguese).

yonenagae
Reptiles described in 1991